Zashkovychi is a village (selo)  in Lviv Raion, Lviv Oblast (province) of Ukraine. It belongs to Horodok urban hromada, one of the hromadas of Ukraine. 
The village is small and has an area of 2,14 km2 and population of the village is around 552 persons.
Local government is administered by Zavydovytska village council.

Geography 

History 
About the village Zashkovychi in writing first mention exists of 1571.

Until 18 July 2020, Zashkovychi belonged to Horodok Raion. The raion was abolished in July 2020 as part of the administrative reform of Ukraine, which reduced the number of raions of Lviv Oblast to seven. The area of Horodok Raion was merged into Lviv Raion.

Cult constructions and religion 
In the village there are the Saint prophet Elijah church (Wooden church, 1830). The church occasionally is used to celebrations. Local architectural monument of Horodok Raion (1571-М).
The new church of St. of Elijah (stone) is built beside.

Gallery

References

External links 
 village Zashkovychi
 weather.in.ua
  Зашковичі - Замки і храми України 
  Зашковичі Церква Св. Пророка Іллі 1838 

Villages in Lviv Raion